Jade Shekells (born 28 September 1996) is an English rugby union player who plays for Worcester Warriors and England Sevens.

Shekells attended Hartpury College before going to Cardiff Met University, she was called up to the England U20s during her time there After returning to her midlands base, Shekells was the Worcester Warriors player of the season for 2020-21.

Shekells was called up by England sevens in spring of 2022, ahead of Rugby Europe Series in Budapest
 Shekells was selected to play for England at the 2022 Commonwealth Games in rugby sevens. She was named in the England squad for the 2022 Rugby World Cup Sevens – Women's tournament held in Cape Town, South Africa in September 2022.

References

 

1996 births
Living people
Female rugby union players
England women's international rugby union players
English female rugby union players